Market Rasen is a town and civil parish within the West Lindsey district of Lincolnshire, England. It lies on the main road between Lincoln and Grimsby, the A46 and is famous for its racecourse. In 2001 the town had a population of 3,200. In the 2011 census the population of the civil parish was 3,904.

History
The place-name 'Market Rasen' is first attested in the Domesday Book of 1086, where it appears as Rase, Rasa and Resne. The name derives from the Old English ræsn meaning 'plank', and is thought to refer to a plank bridge. The river name 'Rase' is a back-formation.

Originally "Rasen", as it is known locally, was called "East Rasen", "Rasen Parva" or "Little Rasen".

In the 19th century the touring theatrical companies performed in theatres in the town. David Grose opened 'a very neat and comfortable theatre' in 1834. In May 1844 the Giffords performed in the town. Market Rasen's community fire and police station opened December 2005.

Geography
The town centre has a homogeneous 19th-century redbrick appearance of mainly Georgian and Victorian architecture, centred on a market place with a medieval church, restored in the 19th century.

The River Rase flows through the town and is crossed by Jameson Bridge, Caistor Road Bridge and Crane Bridge.

In 2011 it was one of the towns chosen for the Portas Review of small-town retailing business.

Education
Market Rasen's secondary school is De Aston School, a co-educational 11-18 former comprehensive school now an academy member with approximately 1,300 pupils, including day pupils and formerly boarders. It was founded in 1863 as a small grammar school as part of a legal settlement following a court case involving funds from the medieval charity of Thomas de Aston, a 13th-century monk.

Within the Market Rasen area are Market Rasen Church of England School, Middle Rasen School and Pre-school and schools at Osgodby, Faldingworth and Legsby. Market Rasen Church of England Primary School is the biggest school in the area and is near to the centre of the town: it was built in the 1930s and was a secondary school until 1974, when the primary school moved to the site.

Middle Rasen School is within  of Market Rasen town centre. The independent Middle Rasen Nursery is situated on the site of the school, and provides progression to full-time education.

February 2008 earthquake

The 10-second quake was the largest recorded example in the United Kingdom since the 1984 Llŷn Peninsula earthquake struck North Wales, measuring 5.4.
There were no recorded local injuries and only one recorded injury elsewhere in the UK, in South Yorkshire, when a chimney was dislodged from a house roof, falling down through the house's roof and landing on the male resident, who was in bed at the time, causing a broken pelvis.

Community
Market days are Tuesdays, Fridays and Saturdays. On each Tuesday there is an auction of goods and produce, and on the first Tuesday of every month, a farmers' market. Every Friday the Women's Institute holds a country market.

The town newspaper is the weekly Market Rasen Mail, which was founded in 1856. It is published by Johnston Press.

People
 The evangelist Ann Carr was born here in 1783
Bernie Taupin, lyricist and long-term collaborator with Elton John spent his teenage years here
Philip Oakes journalist, author and poet died here in 2005
 Tim Bradford, illustrator and author grew up here, his childhood memoir Small Town England: And How I Survived It set between 1978 and 1983 was published by Ebury Press in 2010
Jim Broadbent, actor grew up in nearby Holton cum Beckering
Rod Temperton, hit songwriter for Michael Jackson was at school here
Philippa Lowthorpe, television director was at school here
Gordon White, co-founder of Hanson plc grew up here
Simon Marsden, photographer & baronet lived in the Lincolnshire Wolds nearby
Roger Scruton, philosopher born in nearby Buslingthorpe

See also
Market Rasen railway station
Great Grimsby and Sheffield Junction Railway
Market Rasen Racecourse

References

External links

 
Towns in Lincolnshire
Civil parishes in Lincolnshire
Market towns in Lincolnshire
West Lindsey District